The Chulyms, also Chulym Tatars (self-designation: Татарлар, Tatarlar), are a Turkic people in the Tomsk Oblast and Krasnoyarsk Krai in Russia. According to the 2002 census, there were 656 Chulyms in Russia.

History
The Chulym Tatars first came to the Chulym River when they were driven from their homes in the Sibir Khanate by the forces of Ermak Timofeevich.

They used to live along the middle and lower reaches of the Chulym River (tributary of the Ob River). The Russians used to call them the Chulymian Tatars. The Chulyms appeared in the 16th century as a result of mixing of some of the Turkic groups, who had migrated to the East after the fall of the Khanate of Sibir, partially Teleuts, Yenisei Kyrgyz and groups of Tobolsk Tatars.

During the 16th century, the Russian conquered the Chulyms and their newly settled land. In 1720, the Chulyms were forcefully converted to Christianity. In the early 19th century, the Chulyms were mandated by an edict from the Russian authorities to increase their productivity which further disenfranchised them as they were already burdened with heavy taxation. Under Soviet rule, the Chulyms were collectivized and forced to adopt a sedentary lifestyle. The ideologies of the Soviet government were also imposed upon the Chulyms and their culture. Most of the Chulyms' descendants blended with the Khakas and Russians.

Culture 
They speak Chulym-Turkic language known as Ös and adhere to a religious mixture of Sunni Islam, Russian Orthodoxy and Shamanism.

The Chulyms were originally hunters and trappers. However, modernization has changed their livelihood and they mainly work in factories, tanneries and sawmills.

See also
 Siberian Tatars
 Turkic peoples

Notes

References

 James Stuart Olson, Lee Brigance Pappas and Nicholas Charles Pappas. "An Ethnohistorical Dictionary of the Russian and Soviet Empires". Greenwood Press, 1994. page 162

Ethnic groups in Russia
Turkic peoples of Asia
Indigenous peoples of North Asia
Indigenous small-numbered peoples of the North, Siberia and the Far East
Ethnic groups in Siberia